Dayro d-Mor Gabriel (the Monastery of Saint Gabriel), also known as Deyrulumur, is the oldest surviving Syriac Orthodox monastery in the world.  It is located on the Tur Abdin plateau near Midyat in the Mardin Province in southeastern Turkey.  It has been involved in a dispute with the Turkish government that threatened its existence. Syriac Orthodox culture was centered in two monasteries near Mardin (west of Tur Abdin), Mor Gabriel Monastery and Deyrulzafaran.

History

Dayro d-Mor Gabriel was founded in 397 by the ascetic Mor  Shmu'el (Samuel) and his student Mor Shem'un (Simon). According to tradition, Shem'un had a dream in which an Angel commanded him to build a House of Prayer in a location marked with three large stone blocks. When Shem'un awoke, he took his teacher to the place and found the stone the angel had placed. At this spot Mor Gabriel Monastery built.

The monastery's importance grew and by the 6th century there were over 1000 local and Coptic monks there. The monastery became so famous that it received contributions from Roman Emperors, such as Arcadius, Honorius, Theodosius II and Anastasius. Between 615 and 1049 the Episcopal seat of Tur Abdin was based here and from 1049 until 1915 the monastery had its own diocese. 

In the 7th century, the monastery became known as Monastery of St Gabriel, who was famous for his ascetic life. In the fourteenth century four hundred and forty monks were killed by invading Mongols. In 1991, the remains of monks killed by Timur (Tamerlane) were  found in caves underneath the monastery, dated to the year 1401. During the Seyfo genocide the monks were massacred by Kurds and the monastery was occupied for four years until returned to the church in 1919.

The monastery is an important center for the Syriac-Aramean Christians of Tur Abdin with around fifteen nuns and two monks occupying separate wings, as well as a fluctuating number of local lay workers and guests from overseas. It maintained a significant library however, almost nothing remains. The monastery is currently the seat of the metropolitan bishop of Tur Abdin. In its history the monastery has produced many high-ranking clerics and scholars, among them, four patriarchs, a Maphrian and 84 bishops.

Dayro d-Mor Gabriel is a working community set amongst gardens and orchards, and somewhat disfigured by 1960s residential accommodation. The monastery's primary purpose is to keep Syriac Orthodox Christianity alive in the land of its birth by providing schooling, ordination of native-born monks.  On occasions it has provided physical protection to the Christian population.

Dayro d-Mor Gabriel is open to visitors, and it is possible to stay with permission, but is closed after dark.

Legal disputes 
In the last decade the monastery has been involved in a land dispute with the Turkish government and Kurdish village leaders, particularly those linked to the Çelebi tribe, backed by local representatives of the ruling Justice and Development Party. In 2008 the villages Eğlence, Çandarlı and Yayvantepe as well as the Turkish Land Registry and the Office Forestry Ministry filed legal proceeding disputing the territory of the monastery. The monastery won the legal dispute against the villages but lost to the Turkish authorities which resulted in a loss of territory ownership of 60%, which led the monastery to take the case to the European Court of Human Rights (ECHR). Turkish government assistance to the Kurds is seen as retaliation against the Syriac diaspora for lobbying for international recognition of the killings of tens of thousands of Syriacs during World War I  as genocide. Their attempts to confiscate land owned by the monastery has garnered attention from many European governments and gathered opposition to Turkey's EU bid, and could be the basis of a case by the monastery at the ECHR. Otmar Oehring from Missio, a German Catholic charity, has said that the cases mean that “the state's actions suggest it wishes that the monastery no longer existed.”

There have also been claims that the monastery was built on the grounds of a previous mosque, regardless of the fact that the monastery was founded over 170 years prior to the birth of the Islamic prophet Muhammad.

On 26 January 2011, the Turkish supreme court granted substantial parts of the Monastery to the Turkish Treasury. The ruling was that land inside and adjacent to the monastery, which the monastery has owned for decades and has paid taxes for, belongs to the State.  On June 13, 2012 the Turkish supreme court of appeals upheld this decision, which Arameans continued to protest.

The then Turkish prime minister Erdoğan announced on 30 September 2013 that the land would be returned to the Syriac community in Turkey. This decision was approved a week later (7 October) by the Prime Ministry Directorate General of Foundations. A land registration process of two months would begin and was subject to approval.

The head of the Monastery of Mor Gabriel Foundation was handed the deeds of 12 parcels of the immovable property belonged to the Foundation of the Monastery of Mor Gabriel on 25 February 2014. This was based on the decision taken on 7 October 2013 by the Council of Foundations of the General Directorate of the Foundations. The legal process for taking the remaining 18 parcels of the monastery property continues.

A news report in June 2018 stated that the Turkish Parliament had passed an omnibus bill which was then signed into law by the President to return historic Syriac properties. The government returned the title deeds which had been confiscated from Mor Gabriel Monastery.

See also
Roman architecture
List of Roman domes
Oldest churches in the world

References

13  'Le dernier combat des moines de Turquie', La Croix, Tuesday 21 November 2017, p.18/19

Sources

External links

Presentation
A Cold Wind Sweeping the Tur Abdin
Turkey's Aramaean Minority: More Than Just Mor Gabriel

Christian monasteries in Turkey
Syriac Orthodox monasteries in Turkey
Buildings and structures in Mardin Province
Christian monasteries established in the 4th century
Tur Abdin
Tourist attractions in Mardin Province
390s establishments in the Byzantine Empire
397 establishments
390s establishments
Places of the Assyrian genocide